SS Delamere was a small freighter built during the First World War. Completed in 1915, she was intended for the West African trade. The ship was sunk by the German submarine SM U-70 in April 1917 with the loss of 10 crewmen.

Description 
She had a vertical triple-expansion steam engine driving a single screw propeller. The engine was rated at a total of 224 nominal horsepower and produced .

Construction and career 
Delamere, named for either Delamere, Cheshire, or the Delamere Forest, was laid down as yard number 288 by the Sunderland Shipbuilding Co. at its shipyard in Sunderland for the Watson Steamship Co. The ship was launched on 4 March 1915 and completed on 13 April. She was sold to the Lever Brothers' newly formed Bromport Steamship Co. on 11 May 1916.

References

Bibliography

Ships built on the River Wear
Steamships of the United Kingdom
Maritime incidents in 1917
World War I merchant ships of the United Kingdom
1915 ships
Ships of the Bromport Steamship Company